King Point is a point marking the west side of the entrance to Ambush Bay on the north coast of Joinville Island, Antarctica. It was discovered on 30 December 1842 by a British expedition under James Clark Ross, who named it "Cape King" for Captain (later Rear Admiral) Philip P. King, Royal Navy, 1793–1856, an English naval surveyor who made notable improvements to the charts of Australia and South America.

References

Headlands of the Joinville Island group